Vice Admiral Imran Ahmad  was a flag officer in the Pakistan Navy who has served as Deputy Chief of the Naval Staff (Projects), DCNS-P at Naval Headquarters in Islamabad. He took the office as Head of Projects branch of Pakistan Navy. His previous assignments includes Assistant Chief of Naval Staff (Maintenance), Managing Director of Pakistan Navy Dockyard, in addition to serving as Commandant Pakistan Navy Engineering College and PNS Jauhar.

Career 
He graduated from the National Defence University. He was commissioned in the Pakistan Navy with his first assignment at Marines Engineering branch in 1985. He was also a part of the acquisition mission of the Oliver Hazard Perry-class frigate at the United States.

Awards and decorations

References

Living people
Year of birth missing (living people)
Pakistani naval attachés
Pakistan Navy admirals
Pakistan Naval Academy alumni
Pakistan Naval War College alumni
National Defence University, Pakistan alumni